Brandon Stirling Baker is an American lighting designer working internationally in ballet, opera and theatre.                      
                                                                                                                   
His lighting can be seen in the repertories of New York City Ballet, American Ballet Theatre, Miami City Ballet, 
San Francisco Ballet, The Australian Ballet, Dutch National Ballet, Hong Kong Ballet, Finnish National Ballet, Berlin Staatsballet, Joffrey Ballet, Pacific Northwest Ballet, Houston Ballet, Boston Ballet, Semperoper Ballet Dresden, Alvin Ailey American Dance Theater, Cincinnati Ballet, Pennsylvania Ballet, Dance Theater of Harlem, Paul Taylor Dance Company, and Opera Philadelphia. Baker has designed over 30 premieres world-wide for choreographer Justin Peck, and works frequently with choreographers Jamar Roberts and William Forsythe. 

In 2019, Baker received the prestigious Knight of Illumination Award for his lighting of Justin Peck's Reflections at the Houston Ballet.

Mr. Baker studied at the California Institute of the Arts, Royal Scottish Academy of Music & Drama in Glasgow, Scotland, and the Yale School of Drama as a Special Research Fellow.

References 

http://www.nytimes.com/2014/05/10/arts/dance/new-york-city-ballet-opens-season-with-gala.html?_r=0
http://www.nytimes.com/2012/10/08/arts/dance/city-ballet-performs-justin-pecks-year-of-the-rabbit.html?_r=0
http://www.nytimes.com/2014/05/04/arts/dance/a-former-ballet-hater-teams-up-again-with-a-choreographer.html

External links
http://www.stirlingbaker.com
http://ibdb.com/person.php?id=494202
http://blog.calarts.edu/2013/10/01/brandon-stirling-baker-lights-a-new-ballet/
http://blog.calarts.edu/2012/09/27/baker-lights-new-york-city-ballets-year-of-the-rabbit/

American designers
Artists from California
Living people
1987 births